NGC 4498 is a barred spiral galaxy located about 50 million light-years away in the constellation Coma Berenices. NGC 4498 was discovered by astronomer William Herschel on March 21, 1784. NGC 4498 is a member of the Virgo Cluster.

See also
 List of NGC objects (4001–5000)

Gallery

References

External links

Coma Berenices
Barred spiral galaxies
4498
41472
7669
Astronomical objects discovered in 1784
Virgo Cluster
Discoveries by William Herschel